Brooke Dion Nelson Norton-Cuffy (born 12 January 2004) is an English professional footballer who plays for Coventry City, on loan from Arsenal, as a defender.

Club career
Norton-Cuffy began his career with Chelsea, before joining Arsenal at the age of twelve, and signing his first professional contract on 21 January 2021. On 18 January 2022, joined Lincoln City on loan for the remainder of the season. He made his senior debut coming off the bench away to Plymouth Argyle on 22 January 2022. He scored his first senior goal against Sheffield Wednesday on 5 March 2022.

On 22 August 2022, he joined Rotherham United on a season-long loan. In January 2023 Norton-Cuffy was recalled by Arsenal, and he moved to Coventry City on loan instead.

International career
Born in England, Norton-Cuffy is of Dominica descent. Having already represented England at U16 and U18 level, he made his U19 debut during a 3-1 win over Republic of Ireland during 2022 UEFA European Under-19 Championship qualification at the Bescot Stadium.

On 17 June 2022, Norton-Cuffy was included in the England U19 squad for the 2022 UEFA European Under-19 Championship. He was a second-half substitute in the final as England beat Israel 3-1 in extra time to win the tournament.

Career statistics

Honours

England U19
UEFA European Under-19 Championship: 2022

References

2004 births
Living people
People from Pimlico
Footballers from Greater London
English footballers
English people of Dominica descent
Chelsea F.C. players
Arsenal F.C. players
Lincoln City F.C. players
Rotherham United F.C. players
Coventry City F.C. players
English Football League players
Association football defenders
Black British sportspeople
England youth international footballers